Orta Nova is a railway station in the Italian town of Orta Nova, in the Province of Foggia, Apulia. The station lies on the Adriatic Railway (Ancona–Lecce). The train services are operated by Trenitalia.

Train services
The station is served by the following service(s):

Regional services (Treno regionale) Foggia - Barletta - Bari

See also
Railway stations in Italy
List of railway stations in Apulia
Rail transport in Italy
History of rail transport in Italy

Railway stations in Apulia
Buildings and structures in the Province of Foggia